USS Colington (AG-148/AKS-29) – also known as USS LST-1085 - was an  launched by the U.S. Navy during the final months of World War II. Colington served as a supply and stores-issue ship for the U.S. 7th Fleet, and was decommissioned after the war.

Constructed in Pennsylvania
The second ship to be so named by the Navy, Colington was launched 13 January 1945 by American Bridge Company, Ambridge, Pennsylvania; and commissioned 21 February 1945 as LST-1085.

World War II-related service
Colington served with the U.S. Navy occupation forces in Asia after World War II,

Post-war disposition 
USS LST-1085 was reclassified AG-148 on 27 January and named Colington on 1 February 1949. She was again reclassified to AKS-29 on 18 August 1951.

She was struck from the Navy List 1 April 1960.

References
  
 NavSource Online: Amphibious Photo Archive - LST-1085 - AG-148 / AKS-29 Colington

 

Ships built in Ambridge, Pennsylvania
World War II amphibious warfare vessels of the United States
Cold War auxiliary ships of the United States
1945 ships
LST-542-class tank landing ships converted to stores ships
LST-542-class tank landing ships